Domino effect accident is an accident in which a primary undesired event in an installation sequentially or simultaneously triggers one or more secondary undesired events in nearby installations, leading to secondary and even higher-order accidents, resulting in the overall consequences more severe than those of the primary event. Due to the escalation of accidents, domino effect accident is indeed a chain of accidents. The entire accident escalation process is similar to the mechanical effect of a falling row of dominoes, so it is called a domino effect accident or Knock-on accident. Domino effect accidents are an important safety issue in the process industry in which a lot of hazardous materials are stored, transported, and processed via storage tanks, pipes and process facilities, etc. These hazardous materials may induce poisoning, fire, and explosion when a loss of containment occurs. Fire and explosion within an installation may escalate to other installations by hazardous physical effects such as heat radiation, overpressure, and fragments, etc.

The characteristics of domino effect accidents
Domino effect accidents are different from general accidents in which the accident in installations does not spatially or/and temporally propagate to other installations. The consequences of domino effects are more severe than the primary event and there should be at least one secondary event. Besides, the escalation of accidents is caused by the physical effects induced by primary events. In domino effect accidents, the physical effects are defined as escalation vector. Domino effect accidents mainly consist of three elements: the primary scenario, the escalation vectors, and one or more secondary accidents.

Primary scenarios
The primary scenarios include flash fire, pool fire, jet fire, fireball, Boiling liquid expanding vapor explosion (BLEVE), confined explosion (CE), mechanical explosion (ME) and vapor cloud explosion (VCE). Normally, there is only one primary event such as a tank fire in a gasoline storage farm. In terms of the primary events caused by intentional attacks or natural disasters, multi-primary events may occur. In that case, it may be very difficult to prevent the escalation of domino effects due to the synergistic effects caused by multiple hazardous events. For example, an earthquake may lead to multiple failures of hazardous installations in chemical industrial areas and induce the damage of other critical infrastructures, making the prevention of domino effect accidents more difficult than domino effects caused by accidental events.

Escalation vectors
The escalation vectors are the hazardous effects caused by accident scenarios that can induce the propagation of accidents. The pool fire, jet fire, and fireball can induce escalation vectors of heat radiation and fire impingement. BLEVE, ME, and VCE can induce escalation vectors of overpressure and fragment projection. As a result, the escalation vectors consist of heat radiation, fire impingement, overpressure, and fragment projection. Fire scenarios may induce serious heat loads via escalation vectors on hazardous facilities, resulting in the failure of storage tanks, pipes, process equipment. The failure of vessels caused by heat radiation is a dynamic process due to the time to failure (TTF) while the damage of vessels caused by heat radiation and the occurrence of explosions can be considered to be simultaneous. In light of the characteristics, fire-induced domino effects are time-dependent while explosion-induced domino effects are not related to time.

One or more secondary accidents
Besides the primary scenarios, the escalation vectors, a domino effect accidents need to have one or more secondary accidents. In that case, the primary scenarios in primary installations successfully escalate to other installations nearby, making the overall consequences more severe than the primary event. The escalation from the primary event to the secondary event is called the first-level escalation while the escalation from secondary event to tertiary event is called second-level escalation, and so on. A lower-level event may trigger multiple higher-level events, which is called parallel effects. Alternatively, a higher-level event caused by multiple lower-level events, which is called synergistic effects. Besides, the heat radiation received by a vessel in different periods should be superimposed when it comes to calculating the residual time to failure of the vessel, which is called the superimposed effects.

Types

Intentional and unintentional domino effect accidents
According to the nature of primary events, the domino effect accidents can be divided into two categories: unintentional domino effects and intentional domino effects. The primary events of unintentional domino effects are caused by accidental events (e.g., corrosion, human errors, and leakage) or natural hazards (e.g., earthquake Lightning and flood). The primary event of domino effects is caused by intentional attacks such as terrorist attacks and sabotage. Besides, unintentional domino effects can be divided into two categories: (i) human-caused accidental domino effect accidents and (ii) domino effect accidents caused by natural hazards.

Fire-induced and explosion-induced domino effect accidents
According to the scenario of primary events, domino effects can be divided into two categories: fire-induced domino effect accident and explosion-induced domino effect accident. The primary event of fire-induced domino effect accidents is fire while that of the explosion-induced domino effect accident is explosion. Besides, toxic release may also directly induce domino effects via the movement of toxic gases. For example, the poisoning of humans caused by toxic release may lead to human errors, resulting in secondary accidents. Since toxic release induced domino effects are not as common as the domino effects caused by explosion or fire, it often remains unmentioned.

Internal and external domino effect accidents
In a chemical cluster or a chemical industrial park, there are multiple chemical plants located together. One accident that occurs in a chemical plant may escalate to other chemical plants. Therefore, internal domino effect accidents are the accidents that occur within a chemical plant while external domino effect accidents are the accidents that occur in one chemical plant and propagate outside the chemical plant to other chemical plants. The prevention of external domino effect accidents is more complex than the domino effect prevention in a single chemical plant since the former may be related to multiple companies. Different companies may have different attitudes on the prevention of domino effects, making it difficult to maximize the total prevention benefits. Thus encouraging the cooperation between different companies for the prevention of domino effect accidents is a key issue in a chemical cluster in which multiple chemical plants are located in.

Consequences
The consequences of domino effect accidents can be much more severe than the primary events. Some past catastrophic disasters that occurred in the process industries are induced by domino effects, such as the 2019 Xiangshui chemical plant explosion, 2009 Jaipur fire, 2009 Cataño oil refinery fire, Buncefield fire, Flixborough disaster, etc. In these accidents, most of the chemical plant is damaged. Part of these accidents resulted in huge casualties. Taking the 2019 Xiangshui chemical plant explosion as an example, it led to more than 78 deaths and 617 injuries, and a huge economic loss. As a result, a lot of companies and facilities nearby the chemical plant were damaged. This accident is an example of an external domino effect accident. In light of the severe consequences of domino effect accidents, more public attention should be paid to the protection of chemical industrial areas from these accidents.

Prevention and mitigation measures
To prevent the occurrence of domino effect accidents or mitigate the consequences of domino effect accidents, there are three main principles. On the one hand, we can reduce the likelihood of primary events; on the other hand, we can prevent the escalation of primary events. Besides, when it is inevitable to prevent domino effect accidents, we can mitigate the consequences of domino effects by preventing the further escalation of accidents. Safety barriers are always used to prevent domino effects and mitigate their consequences. Safety barriers used for protecting chemical industrial areas from domino effects consist of active protection measures; passive protection measures, and procedural and emergency measures.

Active protection measures
Active protection measures which need power or external activation to trigger the protection action can be used to (i) suppress fire, such as water/foam sprinklers and (ii) isolate process unit using equipment such as emergency shutdown (ESD) systems. An active protection measure usually consists of three elements: (i) a detection system, (ii) a treatment system, and (iii) an actuation system. In order to ensure the performance of active protection measures, all the above three elements should be inactive, otherwise, the protection does not work.

Passive protection measures
Different from active protection measures, no external activation is needed for passive protection measures. As a result, passive protection measures may be more reliable than active protection measures. Fireproof coating is a commonly-used passive protection measure utilized to isolate chemical vessels from heat radiation induced by external fire. In that case, the time to failure of vessels can be delayed, providing more time for emergency response actions to extinguish the fire. Besides fireproof coating, pressure relief valves are an example of a passive protection measure used to protect pressurized vessels from overpressure.

Procedural and emergency measures
Procedural actions are these operating procedures that can be used to prevent the escalation of both unintentional and intentional domino effects. Emergency measures include internal emergency actions and external emergency response force. Emergency response procedures in chemical plants play an important role in protecting employees, installations, and other civilians nearby. In terms of domino effects, an emergency response such as firefighting can effectively prevent the escalation of accidents by reducing heat radiation and isolating undamaged vessels, thus preventing domino effects or mitigating their consequences. Since the starting of emergency response actions need a period of time, and emergency resources are typically limited, the optimization of emergency procedures and emergency resource allocation is essential for the prevention of domino effects.

References

Accidents
Causality